Forest Springs is a rural locality in the Southern Downs Region, Queensland, Australia.

Geography 
The rest of the locality is flatter land and is used for farming.

The New England Highway is the western boundary of the locality.

History 
Upper Forest Springs Provisional School opened on 15 February 1898. On 1 January 1909 it became Upper Forest Springs State School. It closed on 30 June 1961. The school was on the corner of Forest Springs Road and The Springs Road, now in Spring Creek.

Education 
There are no schools in Forest Springs. The nearest primary school is Allora State School in neighbouring Allora to the south-west. The nearest secondary schools are Allora State School (only to Year 10 only) and Clifton State High School (to Year 12) in Clifton to the north-west.

References 

Southern Downs Region
Localities in Queensland